The 781st Bombardment Squadron is an inactive United States Air Force unit. Its last assignment was to the 465th Bombardment Wing, stationed at Robins Air Force Base, Georgia.  It was inactivated on 25 July 1968.

The squadron was first activated in 1943 as the 781st Bombardment Squadron.  It served in combat in the Mediterranean Theater of Operations as a Consolidated B-24 Liberator unit, earning two Distinguished Unit Citations for its actions.  After V-E Day, the squadron served in Air Transport Command, ferrying men from the combat theater back to the United States.

The squadron was activated again as the 781st Troop Carrier Squadron in 1953, when it replaced a reserve squadron that had been mobilized for the Korean War.  It moved to France, where it provided theater airlift until inactivating in 1958.  The squadron returned to its earlier designation in 1963, when it replaced another B-52 unit at Robins. It was inactivated when it transferred it mission and personnel to another squadron in 1968.

History

World War II

The squadron was first activated at Alamogordo Army Air Field, New Mexico as the 781st  Bombardment Squadron, one of the four original Consolidated B-24 Liberator heavy bomber squadrons of the 465th Bombardment Group.  After training under Second Air Force, the squadron deployed to the Mediterranean Theater of Operations in February 1944.

The squadron arrived in the Mediterranean Theater of Operations, where it was stationed at Pantanella Airfield, Italy in March 1944.  The air echelon halted in Tunisia for additional training before completing its move to Italy, where it became part of Fifteenth Air Force. It flew strategic bombardment combat missions over France, Germany, Italy, Austria and the Balkans, attacking targets such as marshalling yards, docks, aircraft factories and oil production facilities.  On 8 July 1944 the squadron attacked an oil refinery and marshalling yards near Vienna, Austria despite heavy flak and fighter opposition, earning the unit a Distinguished Unit Citation.  It was awarded a second citation for an attack on 3 August 1944 against a steel plant in Friedrichshafen, Germany.

The squadron was occasionally diverted from the strategic campaign.  It attacked troop concentrations in May 1944 to assist partisan forces in Yugoslavia and performed interdiction missions to support the advance on Rome.  Prior to Operation Dragoon, the invasion of southern France, it attacked bridges, railroads and gun emplacements near the landing area.  It supported Red Army and Romanian Army forces advancing in the Balkans in October 1944 and Operation Grapeshot, the advance of Allied forces in Northern Italy in April 1945.

The squadron moved to Waller Field, Trinidad and became part of Air Transport Command in June 1945. It used its Liberators as transports, flying personnel from Trinidad to Florida. The unit was inactivated in Trinidad during July 1945. The squadron was redesignated as very heavy bomber squadron in 1945, but remained inactive.

European airlift

In February 1953, Tactical Air Command activated the 465th Troop Carrier Group at Donaldson Air Force Base, South Carolina to replace the 433d Troop Carrier Group, a reserve unit that had been mobilized for the Korean War.  The squadron was redesignated the 781st Troop Carrier Squadron and assumed the personnel, mission and aircraft of the 310th Troop Carrier Squadron, which was simultaneously inactivated.  At the time it was replaced by the 465th, the 443d Group was in the process of converting to the Fairchild C-119 Flying Boxcar from the Curtiss C-46 Commando it was flying when mobilized.

The squadron's intended base at Évreux-Fauville Air Base, France was still under construction, so in December, the 465th Group moved to Toul-Rosières Air Base, France. Although construction at Toul had progressed, it could only accommodate a single flying squadron, and the 781st located at Wiesbaden Air Base, Germany. By April 1954, construction at Toul was advanced enough that the squadron's parent 465th Troop Carrier Wing could join it and the 781st relocated to Toul on 1 May. The squadron participated in airlift operations, tests and exercises in Europe. Although the squadron mission was troop carrier, there were few American airborne troops in Europe, and it focused on theater airlift flights, particularly supporting fighter units deploying to Wheelus Air Base for training at the ranges there.

In December 1956, the 465th Group became non-operational, in preparation for the 465th Wing reorganization under the dual deputy model.  Until March 1957, when the new organization became effective, the squadron was attached to wing headquarters.  The 465th Group was inactivated in March and the 781st was reassigned directly to the 465th Wing.  Four months later, the 465th Wing inactivated and transferred its operational squadrons to the 317th Troop Carrier Wing, which had moved to Évreux-Fauville Air Base from its former station at Neubiberg Air Base, Germany.  The squadron began conversion to the Lockheed C-130 Hercules, but was inactivated in March 1958.

Strategic Air Command
Strategic Air Command (SAC) had established the 4137th Strategic Wing at Robins Air Force Base, Georgia  as part of SAC's plan to disperse its Boeing B-52 Stratofortress heavy bombers over a larger number of bases, thus making it more difficult for the Soviet Union to knock out the entire fleet with a surprise first strike.  In 1962, in order to perpetuate the lineage of many currently inactive bombardment units with illustrious World War II records, Headquarters SAC received authority from Headquarters USAF to discontinue its Major Command controlled (MAJCON) strategic wings that were equipped with combat aircraft and to activate Air Force controlled (AFCON) units, which could carry on a lineage and history.

As a result, the 4137th was replaced by the 465 Bombardment Wing, and on 1 February 1963, the 781st, returning to its World War II designation of 781st Bombardment Squadron, took over the mission, personnel and equipment of the 342d Bombardment Squadron, which was simultaneously inactivated.  The squadron maintained half of its aircraft on fifteen minute nuclear alert and periodically flew Operation Chrome Dome missions.  and conducted strategic bombardment training operations to meet SAC's operational commitments.  The squadron deployed aircraft and crews to Southeast Asia during the Vietnam War for Operation Arc Light. In 1968, SAC turned Homestead Air Force Base over to Tactical Air Command, and removed its B-52s from the base.  In connection with the transfer of Homestead, the 19th Bombardment Wing moved on paper to Robins to replace the 465th Bombardment Wing.  The 781st was inactivated on 25 July 1968 its assets were transferred to the 28th Bombardment Squadron.

Lineage
 Constituted as the 781st Bombardment Squadron, Heavy on 19 May 1943
 Activated on 1 August 1943
 Inactivated on 31 July 1945
 Redesignated the 781st Troop Carrier Squadron, Medium on 22 December 1952
 Activated on 1 February 1953
 Inactivated on 8 March 1958
 Redesignated the 781st Bombardment Squadron, Heavy and activated on 15 November 1962 (not organized)
 Organized on 1 February 1963
 Discontinued and inactivated on 25 July 1968

Assignments
 465th Bombardment Group, 1 August 1943 – 31 July 1945
 465th Troop Carrier Group, 1 February 1953 (attached to 465th Troop Carrier Wing after 1 December 1956)
 465th Troop Carrier Wing, 12 March 1957
 317th Troop Carrier Wing, 8 July 1957 – 8 March 1958
 465th Bombardment Wing, 15 November 1962 – 25 July 1968

Stations
 Alamogordo Army Air Field, New Mexico, 1 August 1943
 Kearns Army Air Base, Utah, c. 13 September 1943
 McCook Army Air Field, Nebraska, c. 5 October 1943 – 1 February 1944
 Pantanella Airfield, Italy, 28 March 1944 – June 1945
 Waller Field, Trinidad, c. 15 June – 31 July 1945
 Donaldson Air Force Base, South Carolina, 1 February 1953 – December 1953
 Wiesbaden Air Base, Germany, 26 December 1953
 Toul-Rosières Air Base, France, 1 May 1954
 Évreux-Fauville Air Base, France, 24 May 1955 – 8 March 1958
 Robins Air Force Base, Georgia, 1 February 1963 – 25 July 1968

Aircraft
 Consolidated B-24 Liberator, 1943–1945
 Fairchild C-119 Flying Boxcar, 1953–1957
 Lockheed C-130A Hercules, 1957–1958
 Boeing B-52 Stratofortress, 1962–1968

Awards and campaigns

See also

 List of B-52 Units of the United States Air Force

References

Notes
 Explanatory notes

 Citations

Bibliography

 
 
 
 
 
 

Bombardment squadrons of the United States Air Force
Bombardment squadrons of the United States Army Air Forces
Military units and formations established in 1943